Biwong-Bulu is a town and commune in the Mvila department of the South Region of Cameroon.

Name 
The name Biwong-Bulu is derived from "Bulu", the name of the main ethnic group of the area, and  "Biwong", the Bulu phrase "to gather something rare".

History 
The Biwong-Bulu commune was created from the splitting of the former Ebolowa Rural Commune by presidential decree on April 24, 2007.

Geography 
The terrain is largely flat, with plains and plateaus and a few hills.

Demographics 

Climate 
Biwong-Bulu has a tropical climate.

See also
Communes of Cameroon

References

 Site de la primature - Élections municipales 2002 
 Contrôle de gestion et performance des services publics communaux des villes camerounaises - Thèse de Donation Avele, Université Montesquieu Bordeaux IV 
 Charles Nanga, La réforme de l’administration territoriale au Cameroun à la lumière de la loi constitutionnelle n° 96/06 du 18 janvier 1996, Mémoire ENA. 

Populated places in South Region (Cameroon)
Communes of Cameroon